was a town located in Ōsato District, Saitama, Japan.

As of 2003, the town had an estimated population of 13,826 and a density of 605.08 persons per km². The total area is 22.34 km².

On February 13, 2007, Kōnan was merged into the expanded city of Kumagaya and no longer exists as an independent municipality.

Dissolved municipalities of Saitama Prefecture
Kumagaya